Gradient multilayer (GML) nanofilm is an assembly of quantum dot layers with a built-in gradient of nanoparticle size, composition or density.

Properties of such nanostructure are finding its applications in design of solar cells and energy storage devices.

The GML nanostructure can be embedded in the organic material (polymer), or can include quantum dots made of two or more types of material. 

Photovoltaic applications

The GML nanofilm only 100 nanometers thick can absorb the entire Sun spectrum (0.3–2.0+ eV). At the same time, gradient of the quantum dots size can create a gradient of the electrochemical potential, acting as an equivalent of built-in electric field inside a nanofilm. This enhances transport of electrons and holes, and improves internal quantum efficiency (IQE) and photocurrent.

Manufacturing

The industrial manufacturing of GML nanofilms represents a challenge. Traditional methods of building nanostructured materials (like spin coating) can't form GML nanostructures, while more effective methods like Atomic Layer Deposition (ALD) or Langmuir-Blodget "microchemical" method. are expensive.

See also

References

External links 
 Gradient Multi-Layer Nano-films for Photovoltaic and other applications
 

Nanomaterials